New York's 38th State Senate district is one of 63 districts in the New York State Senate. It is currently  represented by Republican William Weber Jr previously represented by Democrat Elijah Reichlin-Melnick since 2021, succeeding fellow Democrat and former IDC member David Carlucci, who waged an unsuccessful run for Congress.

In the 2022 General election incumbent Elijah Reichlin-Melnick lost to his opponent Bill Weber

Geography
District 38 covers the vast majority of Rockland County in the northern New York City suburbs, including the towns of Orangetown, Clarkstown, and Ramapo; the district also crosses the Hudson River to incorporate a small part of Ossining in Westchester County.

The district is located entirely within New York's 17th congressional district, and overlaps with the 95th, 96th, 97th, and 98th districts of the New York State Assembly.

Recent election results

2020

2018

2016

2014

2012

Federal results in District 38

References

38